Brooke Smith (born April 30, 1984) is a professional basketball player most recently in the WNBA.

High school
Born in San Anselmo, California, Smith played for Marin Catholic High School in Kentfield, California, where she was named a WBCA All-American. She participated in the 2002 WBCA High School All-America Game where she scored eight points.

College
Smith played her freshman year in college at Duke University in 2002–03.  After sitting out a year, she played three years at Stanford and graduated in 2007. Following her collegiate career, she was selected 23rd overall in the 2007 WNBA Draft by the Minnesota Lynx, but was released on April 26.  On April 29, the Connecticut Sun signed Smith, only to waive her on May 11.

Duke and Stanford statistics

Source

USA Basketball
Smith was a member of the team representing the USA at the 2005 World University Games Team in Izmir, Turkey. Smith averaged 5.0 points per game while helping the team to a 7–0 record, resulting in a gold medal at the event. Smith connected on 19 of her 24 shot attempts for a 79% shot percentage.

Professional
She played for Virtus Viterbo in the Italian A-1 League for the 2007–08 season., Her 2007–2008 stats: Gescom Viterbo (ITA-A1,1T): 32 games: 14.6ppg, Reb-2(10.3rpg), 2.7spg, FGP: 52.0%, FT: 72.2%

Smith has played with the Phoenix Mercury since the 2008 season, winning the championship in 2009.

For two seasons she played with the Italian team Pool Comense.  In her second season (2009–2010), she led the team in shooting with 17.53 points per game and was Italian A1 League Center of the year and league "First Team".  In 2010–2011, Smith is playing for the current Italian title defending champions Cras Basket Taranto, replacing Rebekkah Brunson.

Notes

External links
WNBA Prospect Profile
WNBA Player Profile
Eurobasket Profile

1984 births
Living people
American women's basketball players
Centers (basketball)
Duke Blue Devils women's basketball players
Phoenix Mercury players
Sportspeople from the San Francisco Bay Area
Stanford Cardinal women's basketball players
People from San Anselmo, California
Universiade gold medalists for the United States
Universiade medalists in basketball
Medalists at the 2005 Summer Universiade